Woods 5: Grey Skies & Electric Light is the fourth studio album as well as the fifth and final studio release from Woods of Ypres, released two months after the death of multi-instrumentalist and frontman David Gold. On February 19, 2013 it was announced that Woods 5 had been nominated for a Juno Award for "Metal/Hard Music Album of the Year", along with the likes of Devin Townsend, Cancer Bats, and Ex Deo, an award that it went on to win.

Production and recording
It was recorded in August 2011 at Beach Road Studios with Siegfried Meier in Goderich, Ontario, and released the following year through Earache Records. In comparison to past Woods of Ypres albums, the album has a stronger emphasis on clean vocals and gothic metal sounds, with little of the black metal sound that was present on previous releases. Woods V is the band's only studio album (and second release overall) to feature guitarist Joel Violette, and the first Woods of Ypres album since Woods III to feature David Gold on studio drums. It also marked the band's final studio collaboration with cellist Raphael Weinroth-Browne and oboist Angela Schleihauf, who had both guested on Woods IV: The Green Album.

Release
Originally slated for a January 30 release date, the final version of the album was released in the UK on February 13 and in the US in April 2012. Though not the band's first release on the label, Woods V marked the band's first and only album to be initially put out under the Earache Records umbrella.

Other versions
A link to an incomplete promotional version of the album was tweeted by Earache Records shortly after David Gold's death on December 21, 2011. This version of the album excluded "Keeper of the Ledger", split "Kiss My Ashes (Goodbye)" into two separate tracks, and had a different track order from the final release. The limited edition vinyl pressing of Woods V includes an exclusive producer's mix of "Finality" on the second disc, which is unavailable officially in other formats.

Also, a vinyl reissue has been announced by Earache Records, and it was released April 7, 2017.

Reception

Critical response

Response to the album was largely positive. About.com gave it a near perfect score of 4.5/5 stars, while Metal Hammer Germany gave it 6/7, praising lead singer Gold's vocals and lyrics.

Charts and awards
On February 19, 2013 it was announced that Woods 5 had been nominated for a Juno Award for "Metal/Hard Music Album of the Year," along with the likes of Devin Townsend, Cancer Bats and Ex Deo, an award that it went on to win.

Track listing 
All lyrics written by David Gold.

Personnel
Woods of Ypres
David Gold - vocals, guitars, drums
Joel Violette - lead guitars, bass, piano

Additional personnel
Angela Schleihauf - oboe
Raphael Weinroth-Browne - cello

References

2012 albums
Woods of Ypres albums
Earache Records albums
Albums published posthumously
Albums produced by Siegfried Meier